Maruyama (written:  or ) is a Japanese surname. Notable people with the surname include:

, Japanese professional wrestler
, Japanese actor
, Japanese judoka
, Japanese women's footballer
, Japanese adventurer and professor of economics
, Japanese Army officer
, Japanese scholar
, Japanese film producer
 Magoroh Maruyama (born 1929), Japanese/American business educator
 Paul Maruyama, an American judoka
, Japanese swimmer
, Japanese record producer
, Japanese engineer
, Japanese fencer
, Japanese shogi player
, Japanese sumo wrestler
, Japanese boxer
, Japanese volleyball player
, Japanese Nordic combined skier
, Japanese volleyball player

Fictional characters
, a character in the multimedia franchise BanG Dream!

Japanese-language surnames